Two Feet Stand is the debut album by Swedish melodic death metal band Gardenian. It was the only album the band recorded for Listenable Records before signing a deal with Nuclear Blast.

Track listing
 "Two Feet Stand" - 3:13
 "Flipside of Reality" - 3:49
 "The Downfall" - 4:07
 "Awake of Abuse" - 3:50
 "Netherworld	3:51	
 "Do Me Now" - 4:07
 "Murder..." - 3:27
 "Freedom" - 3:45
 "Mindless Domination" - 4:03
 "The Silent Fall" - 3:30
 "Ecstasy of Life" (bonus track) - 3:43

Credits
Jim Kjell - vocals, guitars
Niklas Engelin - guitars
Håkan Skoger - bass
Thim Blom - drums
Guest 
Thomas Fredriksson - Keyboard

References 

Gardenian albums
1997 debut albums
Albums recorded at Studio Fredman
Albums produced by Fredrik Nordström